Chanin Hale, married name Chanin Hale Bradshaw, (1928 – 2020), was an American actress on stage, film, and television, perhaps best known for more than forty appearances on The Red Skelton Hour.

Early life
Chanin Hale was born Marilyn Victoria Chanine Hale Harvey in Dayton, Ohio. As a creative, athletic girl, she won art awards and excelled in sports. Being "bit" by the performing bug in school, Hale pursued acting and acquired roles in student and community theater, taking lessons in dancing and singing. She dyed her red hair platinum blonde, and joined the Dayton Y Players, learning Greek tragedy and low comedy. She attained some success in the title role of Annie Get Your Gun, which helped to land a role in Little Mary Sunshine, playing a flirtatious character named Twinkle. Hale took to her mother's family name, retaining it into her professional career.

Career
After high school, Hale moved to New York in 1955 and became a stage actress. She toured with the revue "High Time" performing in plays such as Bus Stop (1955), The Gazebo (1958) (with William Bendix), Little Mary Sunshine (1959), and Come Blow Your Horn (1961).

Hale began in television as secretaries, corpses, and other "bit" roles. In a 1963 UCLA comedy production, she met Jack Albertson who introduced her to Red Skelton. With excellent pantomime skills, Hale appeared regularly on the show. Her other television appearances include roles on Adam-12, The Beverly Hillbillies, Bonanza, The Danny Kaye Show, Death Valley Days, The Dick Van Dyke Show, The Donna Reed Show, Dragnet, Gomer Pyle, U.S.M.C., Green Acres, Hey, Landlord, Hondo, The Jimmy Stewart Show, and Gunsmoke, among others.

Film appearances include Synanon (1965), A Guide for the Married Man (1967), Gunn (1967), The Wicked Dreams of Paula Schultz (1968), Will Penny (1968), The Night They Raided Minsky's (1968), and a small role in Blue Hawaii (1961).

Hale was also a regular supporter of, and toured with, the USO, to Vietnam and other overseas locations, well into the late 1960s. Subsequently, Hale was one of the last successful pinup models. Early in 1969, she was a favorite with the soldiers; thousands of 8x10s were printed and mailed after her photo was published by the New York Daily News posing as Eve in a homemade costume.

Personal life
Hale was married to Richard Bradshaw in 1986 until her death nearly 34 years later.

Filmography
A partial filmography follows.

Film

 Blue Hawaii (1961)
 Synanon (1965)
 A Guide for the Married Man (1967) as Miss Crenshaw
 Gunn (1967) as Scarlotti's Mistress
 The Wicked Dreams of Paula Schultz (1968) as Hilda
 Will Penny (1968) as Girl
 The Night They Raided Minsky's (1968) as Valerie

Television

 The Danny Kaye Show
 Naked City (1961) "Bridge Party" as Miss Webb
 The Red Skelton Hour (1963-1971)
 The Beverly Hillbillies (1965) "Luke's Boy" as Linda Curry
 The Donna Reed Show (1965) "How to Handle a Woman" as Myrtle
 Gomer Pyle, U.S.M.C. (1965-1968)
 "A Star Is Not Born" (1968) as Gloria
 "Double Date with the Sarge" (1965) as Hostess
 The Legend of Jesse James (1965) "The Quest" as Marie 
 The Dick Van Dyke Show (1966) "Bad Reception in Albany" as Sugar Henderson
 The Double Life of Henry Phyfe (1966) "Phyfe and the Code Book: Part 2" as Pretty Blonde
 My Favorite Martian (1966) "Martin, the Mannequin" as Sales Girl 
 Hey, Landlord (1966) "Pursuit of a Dream" as Lady Godiva 
 The Wild Wild West (1966) "The Night of the Whirring Death" as Flo
 Death Valley Days (1967) "Shanghai Kelly's Birthday Party" as Flora
 The F.B.I. (1967) "Rope of Gold" as Bobbie 
 Hondo (1967) "Hondo and the Gladiators" as Carrot Top
 Blondie (1968) "Dagwood the Wheeler Dealer" as Mrs. Hathaway
 Dragnet (1969)
 "Frauds (DR-36)" as Helen Zimmerman
 "Vice (DR-30)" as Dottie Taylor 
 I Dream of Jeannie (1969) "Jeannie and the Bachelor Party" as Girl at the Party 
 In Name Only (1969) as Barbara
 Bonanza (1969-1970)
 "The Trouble with Trouble" as Lily
 "Mrs. Wharton and the Lesser Breeds" as Laura Mae Mears 
 Green Acres (1969-1970)
 "Oliver's Double" as Blanche Foster
 "Beauty Is Skin Deep" as Girl
 "The Special Delivery Letter" as Post Office Clerk 
 Howdy (1970)
 Gunsmoke (1971-1975)
 "The Sharecroppers" (S2E24) as Woman
 "Lavery" (S16E22) as Verna
 "The River: Part 1" (S18E1) as Apple Pie Lady
 "Talbot" (S18E23) as Sally
 The Jimmy Stewart Show (1972)
 "Jim's Decision" as Lala Brodu
 "Song of the Jailbird" as Candy Jar 
 Adam-12 (1972-1974)
 "Lost and Found" as Irma Baker 
 "North Hollywood Division" as Helen Dugan
 The Mary Tyler Moore Show (1973) "Hi There, Sports Fans" as Waitress 
 Laverne & Shirley (1976) "Angels of Mercy" as Nurse
 Marcus Welby, M.D. (1976) "How Do You Know What Hurts Me?" as Lois
 Mobile One (1976) "Libel" as Carol North
 Police Woman (1976) "Mother Love" as Adoption Clerk
 Chico and the Man (1977) "Uncle Sonny" as Annalou Brown
 The Love Boat (1977) "Lonely at the Top / Silent Night / Divorce Me, Please" as Claire
 Welcome Back, Kotter (1977) "There Goes Number 5" as Orshack's Secretary
 No Man's Valley (1981) as Nipponia (voice)

References

External links
 
 
 Chanin Hale at Turner Classic Movies

1928 births
2020 deaths
People from Dayton, Ohio
American film actresses
American television actresses
20th-century American actresses